Tunnels of Armageddon is a computer game involving racing and shooting while avoiding obstacles.

Summary
The game features pseudo-3D graphics.  Gameplay involves piloting a futuristic spacecraft through a series of tunnels to a destination within a certain time limit.  Colliding into obstructions depletes a limited amount of shields given.  The game is Sci-Fi in theme.  The rather simple plot amounted to traversing deeper into tunnels to save Earth from evil aliens.  The PC version had support for both EGA and VGA graphics, as well as an Ad-Lib or Soundblaster soundcard.

1989 video games
Amiga games
Apple IIGS games
DOS games
Video games developed in the United States
California Dreams (publishing label) games